Mike Errico is an American singer-songwriter, producer, author, professor, and journalist.

Career
Errico worked as Senior Online Editor for Blender magazine from 2006 to 2008.

Since 2013, Errico has taught songwriting and music business at universities including Yale, Wesleyan, The New School, and NYU’s Clive Davis Institute of Recorded Music, where he was nominated for the David Payne-Carter Award for Excellence in Teaching (2019). Errico’s opinions and insights have appeared in publications including The New York Times, CNN, The Wall Street Journal, Fast Company, The UK Independent, and The Observer.

Errico has toured internationally, playing major music festivals and sharing stages with artists including Raul Midón, Bob Weir, Amos Lee, Derek Trucks, Jonatha Brooke, Ben Folds, and Dan Wilson. 

Errico has written TV theme songs including VH1's hit series Pop Up Video. He formed Tallboy 7, Inc., a company that provides a home for his creative work. In 2021, Errico published the book Music, Lyrics, and Life: A Field Guide for the Advancing Songwriter.

Bibliography
Music, Lyrics, and Life: A Field Guide for the Advancing Songwriter (2021)

Discography
Minor Fits (2017)
Wander Away (2011)
Songs from Lift (2010)
All In (2007)
Skimming (2004)
Tonight I Drink You All (2001)
Pictures of the Big Vacation (1999)
Bite Size (1997)

References

American male singer-songwriters
Living people
Singers from New York City
Year of birth missing (living people)
Singer-songwriters from New York (state)